Essa or ESSA may refer to:

Places
 Essa, Ontario, Canada
 Saltash (Cornish: Essa), a town and civil parish in Cornwall, England, UK
 Essa Academy, Bolton, England, UK
 Stockholm-Arlanda Airport (ICAO code)

People

Given name
 Essa (rapper) or Yungun, British rapper
 Essa Al-Zenkawi (born 1992), Kuwaiti–Hungarian discus thrower
 Essa M. Faal, Gambian lawyer at the International Criminal Court
 Essa Obaid (bodybuilder) (born 1979), Emirati bodybuilder
 Essa Obaid (footballer) (born 1984), Emirati football player
 Essa Rios, José Delgado Saldaña (born 1978), Mexican professional wrestler

Surname
 Irfan Essa, Pakistani-American computer engineering academic
 Michael Essa, American drifter and racing driver
 Muhammad Essa (born 1983), Pakistani football player and coach
 Omair Essa (born 1995), Qatari footballer
 Qazi Muhammad Essa (1914–1976), Pakistani politician
 Salim Essa, South African businessman

Acronyms
 Economic Society of South Africa
 Environmental Science Services Administration, precursor of the US National Oceanic and Atmospheric Administration
 European Social Simulation Association
 Event Supplier and Services Association
 Every Student Succeeds Act, a 2015 American law

See also
ESSA-1, satellite
ESSA-2, satellite
ESSA-3, satellite
ESSA-4, satellite
ESSA-5, satellite
ESSA-6, satellite
ESSA-7, satellite
ESSA-8, satellite
ESSA-9, satellite